West Midlands Councils was a regional grouping of the Local Government Association.

It was established as the Local Authority Leaders’ Board for the West Midlands region of England. It assumed the functions previously carried out by the West Midlands Regional Assembly when that body was abolished in March 2010.

The body was initially known as the West Midlands Leaders Board, changing its identity in July 2010, following abolition of regional spatial strategies by the new UK administration.

The secretariat for the West Midlands Leaders' Board has since been incorporated in-house by Wolverhampton City Council, rather than a separate body exist for such purposes.

References

External links
West Midlands Employers

Local authority leaders' boards in England
Local government in the West Midlands (region)
2010 establishments in England
Government agencies established in 2010
Organisations based in Birmingham, West Midlands
Local Government Association